August Pieper (1844 in Hannover – 29 April 1891, in Hamburg) was a German architect, active in Dresden, Cologne and Hamburg. His brother was the engineer Carl Pieper (1842–1901), who also lived and worked in Hamburg in the 1880s.

Life
He studied at secondary school and the university in his birthplace, before studying at the Vienna University of Technology under Friedrich von Schmidt, through whose efforts Pieper moved to Dresden in 1867. There Pieper designed the Christuskirche in Freital-Deuben, then All Saints Church and several villas on the city's Goethestraße (now Gret-Palucca-Straße). In 1873 he moved to Cologne and in 1879 to Hamburg.

Works
 1867: Draft design of the Christuskirche in Freital-Deuben
 1868–1869: All Saints Church, Dresden
 1869–1870: Villa Goethestraße 12 in Dresden
 1869–1870: Villa Goethestraße 13 in Dresden
 1872: Design entered into the competition for the Niederwalddenkmal (won first prize, but never built)
 1886–1888: Portals into the Neuen Elbbrücke in Hamburg (with the architect Wilhelm Hauers and the engineer Franz Andreas Meyer)

References 

 Architekten- und Ingenieur-Verein zu Hamburg (Hrsg.): Denkschrift zum 50jährigen Stiftungsfest des Architekten- und Ingenieur-Vereins zu Hamburg am 18. April 1909. Boysen & Maasch, Hamburg 1909, S. 61f. (Kurzbiografie).
  Fritz Löffler: Das alte Dresden. Geschichte seiner Bauten. E. A. Seemann, Leipzig 1981, .
  Volker Helas: Architektur in Dresden 1800–1900. Verlag der Kunst Dresden GmbH, Dresden 1991, .

1844 births
1891 deaths
19th-century German architects
Architects from Hanover